Marc-Gauthier Bedimé (born 29 December 1994 in Dibombari) is a Cameroonian–French footballer who plays as a defender for Vendée Fontenay Foot. He previously played for Sochaux B and ASM Belfort in France and for Bulgarian club Lokomotiv Plovdiv.

References

External links 

1994 births
Living people
Cameroonian footballers
French footballers
French sportspeople of Cameroonian descent
Association football defenders
FC Sochaux-Montbéliard players
ASM Belfort players
PFC Lokomotiv Plovdiv players
Bergerac Périgord FC players
Vendée Fontenay Foot players
Championnat National players
Championnat National 2 players
Championnat National 3 players
First Professional Football League (Bulgaria) players
Expatriate footballers in France
Expatriate footballers in Bulgaria